Sauðárkrókur Airport  is an airport serving Sauðárkrókur, a village on the Skagafjörður bay in northern Iceland.

The Hegranes non-directional beacon (Ident: HE) is 1.8 nautical miles northeast of the airport.

Airlines and destinations
With Eagle Air ceasing to operate flights to Reykjavík in May 2018, there are no more scheduled flights from Sauðárkrókur.

Statistics

Passengers and movements

See also 
 Transport in Iceland
 List of airports in Iceland

Notes

References

External links 
 
 OurAirports - Sauðárkrókur Airport
 OpenStreetMap - Sauðárkrókur
 SkyVector - Saudarkrokur Airport

Airports in Iceland
Sauðárkrókur